Stanstead is a township municipality of about 1,100 people in the Memphrémagog Regional County Municipality in the Estrie region of Quebec.  It is not to be confused with the city of Stanstead, which is nearby although not directly adjacent (the municipality of Ogden lies in between).

Formally, the township consists of two villages: Fitch Bay (founded in 1855) and Georgeville (founded in the 1890s). Both villages formed as a result of English-speaking migrants from the United States state of Vermont until borderline customs stations were established  after 1920. Today, the population is bilingual with predominance in French language (about 64%).

Demographics 

See also 
 List of township municipalities in Quebec

References

External links

Township municipalities in Quebec
Incorporated places in Estrie